"Ah, And We Do It Like This" is the debut single by American hip hop group Onyx. It was released on April 30, 1990 by Profile Records.

In February 2012, "Ah, And We Do It Like This" was remastered and included in Arista Records' compilation album Giant Single: The Profile Records Rap Anthology.

Background
In 1989, Onyx signed Jeffrey Harris as their manager, who helped them secure a single deal with the label Profile Records. In 1990, at York Studio in Brooklyn, they recorded their first single, "Ah, And We Do It Like This", which was released to low sales on April 30, 1990 on Profile. The song was produced by Onyx's first producer B-Wiz, who later despite the reproaches from Fredro sold his drum machine SP-12 and went to Baltimore to sell crack, and eventually he was killed there.
"...That very first record was produced by a producer named B-Wiz. B-Wiz was the first producer of that record. He produced “Ah, And We Do It Like This,” and a lot of the original shit in like ’89, ’87, and ’88 for Onyx."

The single didn't have enough promotion. Nothing happened."...A lot of it was because we weren't being heard", says Suavé. "There was no marketing or promotion behind it. We made it to wax, yeah, but it was a project that wasn't complete because the record company wasn't behind us."

Production
In Brian Coleman's book Check the Technique, Fredro Starr describes the song as made in a country style:"...I went down south every summer to visit my grandmother and I kind of picked up a southern accent from my time down there. So when I got back to New York I was rhyming like I was from the south, country style. It was a whole different style. Smoother, and with the country thing. It was about partying, girls in the club, having fun with it."

WEFUNK Radio has marked the song as very jazz influenced, much unlike their later work.

Queens's resident B-1 describes the song as popular in clubs at the time: They first song was “Ahh, And We Do It Like This” on Profile Records. They used to have a different type of style, but that was the style back then. The whole club style.

In Andrew J. Rausch's book I Am Hip-Hop: Conversations on the Music and Culture, Sticky Fingaz said that with this single Onyx is ahead of their time:
"...It wasn't the Onyx sound that we know today, but actually I think they were ahead of their time. They were kind of singing, and that's where hip-hop is at right this second. So they were like 20 years ahead of their time."

According to Fredro, Kool DJ Red Alert played on the radio only instrumental from this single. When Fredro met Red Alert at the club, he asked him why he only played the instrumental, to which Red honestly told him that he just didn't like the lyrics in this song.

Single track listing

A-Side
"Ah, And We Do It Like This" - 5:05
"Ah, And We Do It Like This" (Dub Club) - 5:05

B-Side
"Ah, And We Do It Like This" (Dub Vocal) - 5:16
"Ah, And We Do It Like This" (Instrumental) - 5:12

Personnel 
 Onyx - performer, vocals
 Fredro Starr - performer, vocals
 Suave - performer, vocals
 Big DS - performer, vocals
 Jeffrey Harris - manager, producer
 B-Wiz - producer
 Salah - engineer

References

1990 debut singles
Onyx (group) songs
1990 songs
Profile Records singles